Victor Rubilar is an Argentinian professional football performer and comedian based in Spain. He is an official Guinness World Record Holder. He worked as a magician for three years in Argentina before he decided to become a professional football freestyler / football juggler. 
He moved from Argentina to Sweden to study at the school of contemporary arts in Cirkus Cirkör. He specialized in football freestyling, football juggling and acrobatics. He was also educated in the arts of performing, theatre and dance.

Riksteatern
After he finished his education he worked at the Swedish National Theatre Riksteatern as a main character in a football show touring 6 months around Sweden. He performed "En Liten Föreställning om Fotboll" in over 40 cities all over Sweden.

Guinness World Records
In January 2018 Victor Rubilar broke the Guinness World Record of the most R.A.F (rolls of a football around the face) in one minute. The record was set live on a Spanish TV Program Luar and he managed to 40 R.A.F in one minute. Making it of a speed of one R.A.F every 1,5 seconds. He broke his own record that was set in October 2013 at the Maltepe Park Mall in Istanbul, Turkey. The original record was of 35 R.A.F in one minute. 
In 2007, he broke three Guinness World Records in one day. The records he broke are "The most rolls of a football from temple to temple" (42), "The most footballs juggled" (5) and "The longest time to spin a football on the forehead" (19.96 seconds). In 2008, he broke the record of "The most rolls of a football from temple to temple" again. This time he did 67. Also he broke a new world record of "The longest distance travelled while balancing a ball on the forehead" (278 meters). Victor Rubilar has been featured on the Guinness Book of records in 2008 and 2009.
In 2010 Victor Rubilar set a new world record of "The most consecutive football rolls across the forehead". He did 581 at Cicerellos Fish 'n' Chips in Fremantle, Western Australia, Australia, on 1 April 2010.

Freestyle show
Rubilar specializes in mixing football freestyle and football juggling skills with dance, acrobatics and comedy. During his career he has taken part in commercials for Coca-Cola, Puma and Etisalat. 
His shows are known for combining football freestyle skills with world-class juggling tricks with three and five footballs.
He did a show for Puma in Germany with the football star Pele, at the finals of the French league in front of 80.000 people at the Stade de France Stadium. He has performed with Adidas in a Scandinavia tour (+Challenge), with Puma in Switzerland during the Euro Cup 2008.
Since the start of his career he has performed in over 30 countries in over 150 different cities all over the world. He performs between 100 and 200 shows in around 10–15 different countries per year.

Rampljuset
In 2009 Victor Rubilar was competing on a Swedish TV Talent show (Rampljuset) where he won the title of "The performer of the year".

Quotes from the Jury of the TV program:
"This was even better that the other two times you have been here. Every time you have been raising the bar".

"You are an extremely good entertainer. You get the audience with you everywhere and on exactly everything you do".

Comedy show
One of Rubilar's specialties is comedy shows. 
Circus Super Star is the name of his latest show. He developed this show in Argentina in 2007. This is a 45-minute comedy show.

Description of the show:
Imagine an entire football arena combined with the sensation of watching a hilarious soap opera. During the show Victor Rubilar builds up an intense relationship between his Latino character and the audience. This is a show with not only humor but a high technical level of juggling. Victor combines juggling with footballs, juggling balls, acrobatic, magic and loads of comedy.
Victor Rubilar have performed this award-winning show all over Europe, Dubai, Qatar, Bahrain, Abu Dhabi, Canada, India, Australia, New Zealand, Malaysia, Singapore and South America.

TV appearances
In 2018 Victor Rubilar did an appearance on the TV Show Luar where he broke a Guinness World Record Live.
In 2017 Victor Rubilar appeared on the TV Show Luar and during the same year he did a performance in Saudi Arabia in front of the Prince of Saudi Arabia Mohammad bin Salman.
In 2007 Victor participated on the Swedish competition show Talang. In 2009, he won the Swedish TV talent show Rampljuset.
In 2010, he broke the Guinness World Record of the most R.A.F in a minute live on Yetenek Sizsiniz Türkiye (the Turkish version of the TV program "America's Got Talent").

Other awards
Victor Rubilar has won the most consecutive festivals in the world between 2011–2012, seven consecutive awards in three continents.

Festivals:
 2nd Place "People's Choice Award" 2019 Kamloops International Buskers Festival
 1st Place "People's Choice Award" 2018 Kamloops International Buskers Festival
 1st Place "People's Choice Award" 2018 Saint John Buskers Festival
 2nd Place "People's Choice Award" 2017 Toronto Buskers Festival
 3rd Place "People's Choice Award" 2017 Halifax international buskers festival
 1st Place "People's Choice Award" 2016 Toronto Buskers Festival
 2nd Place "People's Choice Award" 2013 Halifax Busker Festival
 1st Place "People's Choice Award" 2012 Halifax Busker Festival
 3rd Place "People's Choice Award" 2012 Port Credit Festival
 1st Place "People's Choice Award" 2012 Victoria International Busker Festival
 1st Place "People's Choice Award" Auckland Busker Festival 2012
 1st Place "People's Choice Award" 2011 Port Credit Festival]
 1st Place "People's Choice Award" 2011 Halifax Busker Festival]
 1st Place "People's Choice Award" 2011 Victoria International Busker Festival
 1st Place "Director's Choice Award" 2011 Australian Champhionship of Surfers Paradise
 1st Place "People's Choice Award" 2010 Sault Ste. Marie Busker Festival
 2nd Place "People's Choice Award" 2010 Port Credit Festival
 1st Place "Director's Choice Award" 2010 Port Credit Festival

References

External links

 Victor Rubilar official site
 Victor Rubilar official fan page
 Hindustan Times Newspaper
 DNA India Newspaper
 Guinness World Records Day
 Learn Football Freestyle
 Asian Football Cup
 WA Today Newspaper
 Ystad Alehhanda
 Metro Halifax 2010
 Svenska Dagbladet
 The Irish Times
 Kulturen Tidningen
 The Western Australian
 Guinness World Records Blog
 Metro News Canada

Jugglers
Freestyle footballers
Swedish circus performers
Talang (Swedish TV series) contestants
Reality show winners
Living people
Year of birth missing (living people)
Turkey's Got Talent contestants